Ben Sherwen (born 1983) is an English male lawn bowler.

Bowls career
Sherwen became the English champion when he won the singles tournament during the 2015 National Championships.

He bowls for Whitehaven Bowling Club.

References

Living people
English male bowls players
1983 births